Ultra Twister may refer to:

Ultra Twister (Six Flags), amusement ride at two  Six Flags parks in the United States until 2005
Ultra Twister (Nagashima Spa Land), amusement ride at the Nagashima Spa Land park ain Mie Prefecture, Japan